Terence John Parr (born 1964 in Los Angeles) is a professor of computer science at the University of San Francisco. He is best known for his ANTLR parser generator and contributions to parsing theory. He also developed the StringTemplate engine for Java and other programming languages.

Education
Parr holds a Bachelor's degree in Computer Science, a Master's degree in Engineering, and a PhD in Computer Engineering from Purdue University. He was a postdoctoral fellow in the Army High-Performance Computing Research Center (also known as AHPCRC), located in the University of Minnesota.

Books

References

External links
 Personal homepage

American computer scientists
University of San Francisco faculty
1964 births
Living people